Shazia Abid is a Pakistani politician who had been a member of the Provincial Assembly of the Punjab from August 2018 till January 2023.

Political career

She was elected to the Provincial Assembly of the Punjab as a candidate of Pakistan Peoples Party (PPP) on a reserved seat for women in 2018 Pakistani general election. In the same election, she also ran for the seat of the National Assembly as a PPP candidate from NA-193 (Rajanpur-I) but was unsuccessful. She received 27,183 votes and lost the seat to Jaffar Khan Leghari.

References

Living people
Punjab MPAs 2018–2023
Pakistan People's Party MPAs (Punjab)
Year of birth missing (living people)
Women members of the Provincial Assembly of the Punjab
21st-century Pakistani women politicians